Robert Jolly (born 1885, date of death unknown) was a British cyclist. He competed in two events at the 1908 Summer Olympics.

References

External links
 

1885 births
Year of death missing
English male cyclists
Olympic cyclists of Great Britain
Cyclists at the 1908 Summer Olympics
Sportspeople from Liverpool